Bloom Township is one of the sixteen townships of Scioto County, Ohio, United States.  The population at the 2010 census was 3,235, out of which 2,369 people resided in the unincorporated portions of the township.

Geography
Located in the far east of the county, it borders the following townships:
Hamilton Township, Jackson County - north
Jefferson Township, Jackson County - northeast
Washington Township, Lawrence County - east
Decatur Township, Lawrence County - southeast
Vernon Township - south
Porter Township - southwest corner
Harrison Township - west
Madison Township - northwest

The village of South Webster is located in the center of the township, and the unincorporated community of Scioto Furnace lies in the township's west.

Name and history
Statewide, other Bloom Townships are located in Fairfield, Morgan, Seneca, and Wood counties.

Bloom Township was organized on August 25, 1812. The township was named for a bloomery within its borders. By the 1830s, other industries included three stores, one tavern and two tan yards.

Government
The township is governed by a three-member board of trustees, who are elected in November of odd-numbered years to a four-year term beginning on the following January 1. Two are elected in the year after the presidential election and one is elected in the year before it. There is also an elected township fiscal officer, who serves a four-year term beginning on April 1 of the year after the election, which is held in November of the year before the presidential election. Vacancies in the fiscal officership or on the board of trustees are filled by the remaining trustees.

Notable people
Edward Oscar McCowen, Republican member of the U.S. House of Representatives.

References

External links
County website

Townships in Scioto County, Ohio
Townships in Ohio